Darryl Bryan Middleton (born July 21, 1966) is an American former professional basketball player and current assistant coach for CSKA Moscow of the VTB United League. Standing at 6'8" (2.03 m), he played at the power forward position. He holds the record for being the oldest player to ever play a game in the history of the Spanish ACB League. He also holds a Spanish passport.

College career
Middleton played college basketball with the Baylor Bears.

Professional career

After college, Middleton was selected by the Atlanta Hawks in the 3rd round (68th overall) of the 1988 NBA draft. However, he never played in the NBA. He did however, have a prosperous basketball career in Europe, with teams such as: Çukurova Sanayi, Aresium Milan, Girona, FC Barcelona, Joventut Badalona, Caja San Fernando, Panathinaikos, and Dynamo Saint Petersburg.

He won three Spanish League Most Valuable Player awards (1992, 1993, 2000). He also won two Spanish League championships (1995, 1996), while playing with FC Barcelona. From 2000 to 2005, Middleton played with Panathinaikos, and with them he won four Greek League championships (2001, 2003, 2004, 2005), two Greek Cups (2003, 2005), and the 2001–02 Euroleague championship. In 2007, Middleton won the FIBA EuroCup, while playing with Girona.

He then continued to play with Girona, as part of the re-founded Sant Josep. In March 2011, he signed a contract with Valencia Basket.

After Girona, he signed with CB Lucentum Alicante. Lucentum Alicante, despite having finished in 6th place in the Liga ACB, and having earned the right to play in European-wide league, sold their place in the top Spanish League, and played instead in the Spanish 2nd Division LEB Oro, during the 2012–13 season. This was due to financial issues. Middleton was a part of the team during that season, and he helped them to finish in 3rd place in the Spanish 2nd Division, and after winning in the league's playoffs, they earned a return to the top-tier level Liga ACB.

In October 2013, at the age of 47, Middleton signed with Servigroup Benidorm of the Liga EBA, the Spanish fourth division league.

Coaching career
In June 2014, Middleton was appointed as an assistant coach for Dimitrios Itoudis in the Russian team CSKA Moscow.

References

External links
 Darryl Middleton at acb.com 
 Darryl Middleton at eurobasket.com
 Darryl Middleton at euroleague.net
 Darryl Middleton  at legabasket.it 
 Darryl Middleton at thedraftreview.com
 Darryl Middleton at eurocupbasketball.com

1966 births
Living people
American expatriate basketball people in Italy
American expatriate basketball people in Russia
American expatriate basketball people in Spain
American expatriate basketball people in Turkey
American men's basketball players
Basketball players from New York City
Atlanta Hawks draft picks
Baylor Bears men's basketball players
BC Dynamo Saint Petersburg players
CB Girona players
CB Lucentum Alicante players
FC Barcelona Bàsquet players
Greek Basket League players
Joventut Badalona players
Liga ACB players
Panathinaikos B.C. players
Power forwards (basketball)
Real Betis Baloncesto players
Spanish men's basketball players
Spanish people of American descent
Valencia Basket players